The 1999 European Ladies' Team Championship took place 6–10 July at Golf de Saint Germain in Saint-Germain-en-Laye, France. It was the 21st women's golf amateur European Ladies' Team Championship.

Venue 
The course, situated 25 kilometres west of the city center of Paris, France, was designed by Harry Colt and opened in 1922.

The championship course was set up with par 72.

Format 
All participating teams played two qualification rounds of stroke-play with six players, counted the five best scores for each team.

The eight best teams formed flight A, in knock-out match-play over the next three days. The teams were seeded based on their positions after the stroke-play. The first placed team was drawn to play the quarter final against the eight placed team, the second against the seventh, the third against the sixth and the fourth against the fifth. In each match between two nation teams, two 18-hole foursome games and five 18-hole single games were played. Teams were allowed to switch players during the team matches, selecting other players in to the afternoon single games after the morning foursome games. Games all square after 18 holes were declared halved, if the team match was already decided.

The six teams placed 9–14 in the qualification stroke-play formed flight B, to play similar knock-out match-play, with one foursome game and four single games, to decide their final positions.

The three teams placed 15–17 in the qualification stroke-play formed flight C, to meet each other, with one foursome game and four single games, to decide their final positions.

Teams 
17 nation teams contested the event. Each team consisted of six players.

Players in the leading teams

Other participating teams

Winners 
Host nation France lead  the opening 36-hole qualifying competition, with a score of 4 under par 716, 20 strokes ahead of team England.

Individual leader in the 36-hole stroke-play competition was Maïtena Alsuguren, France, with a score of 5 under par 139, one stroke ahead of Maria Bodén, Sweden.

Team France won the championship, beating England 4–2 in the final and earned their sixth title. Team Germany earned third place, beating Netherlands 5–2 in the bronze match.

Results 
Qualification round

Team standings

* Note: In the event of a tie the order was determined by the better total non-counting scores.

Individual leaders

 Note: There was no official award for the lowest individual score.

Flight A

Bracket

Final games
{| class="wikitable"
| align="center" width="180" | 
| align="center" width="180" | 
|-
| align="right" | 4.5
| 2.5
|-
|Alsuguren / Monnet 2 & 1
|<small>Andrew / Brown</small>
|-
|Arricau / Icher 3 & 2
|Duggleby / Hudson
|-
|Marine Monnet 6 & 5
|Fiona Brown
|-
|Stéphanie Arricau AS *
|Rebecca Hudson AS *
|-
|Virgine Auffret 3 & 2
|Kirsty Fisher
|-
|Karine Icher
|Emma Duggleby 16th hole **
|-
|Maitena Alsuguren
|Kim Andrew 16th hole **
|}
* Note: Game all square after 18 holes declared halved, since team match already decided.

** Note: English player declared winner after 16th hole, since team match already decided.Flight BBracketFlight CTeam matchesFinal standings'''

Sources:

See also 
 Espirito Santo Trophy – biennial world amateur team golf championship for women organized by the International Golf Federation.
 European Amateur Team Championship – European amateur team golf championship for men organised by the European Golf Association.

References

External links 
 European Golf Association: Results

European Ladies' Team Championship
Golf tournaments in France
European Ladies' Team Championship
European Ladies' Team Championship
European Ladies' Team Championship